Edward "Zeke" Zubrow (born February 7, 1951) is a former American football coach.  He served as the head football coach at the University of Pennsylvania from 1986 to 1988, compiling a record of 23–7. After leading the Penn Quakers to two Ivy League titles, in 1986 and 1988, Zubrow resigned from his post at Penn in March 1989 to take a job with the School District of Philadelphia to combat drug abuse and dropout rates.

Head coaching record

College

References

1951 births
Living people
American school administrators
Haverford Fords baseball players
Haverford Fords football players
Penn Quakers football coaches
High school football coaches in Pennsylvania